Brian Carolan (18 February 1927 – 1 August 1983) was an Australian sailor. He competed in the Dragon event at the 1956 Summer Olympics.

References

External links
 

1927 births
1983 deaths
Australian male sailors (sport)
Olympic sailors of Australia
Sailors at the 1956 Summer Olympics – Dragon
Place of birth missing